Abdelmalik Hebbar, known as Malik Hebbar, (born 6 October 1973 in Bondy) is a former French professional football player of Algerian origin who was most recently coach of JA Drancy.

He played on the professional level for FC Istres, FC Gueugnon and Stade Reims in Ligue 2.

References

1973 births
Living people
People from Bobigny
French footballers
Ligue 2 players
FC Istres players
FC Gueugnon players
Stade de Reims players
French sportspeople of Algerian descent
Olympique Noisy-le-Sec players
JA Drancy players
Association football midfielders
Footballers from Seine-Saint-Denis